Plumbago  may refer to:

Genera
Plumbago, the leadworts, a genus of flowering plants
Plumbago (butterfly), a genus of skipper butterflies

Materials
 Used generically for lead ores such as galena and lead oxides such as red lead
 Plumbago (mineral) an archaic word for the mineral form of graphite
Plumbago drawing, graphite portraits of the seventeenth and eighteenth centuries

Genus disambiguation pages